Somerleyton railway station is on the Wherry Lines in the east of England, serving the village of Somerleyton, Suffolk. Its three-letter station code is SYT.

The station is managed by Greater Anglia, which also operates all of the trains that call.

In The Rings of Saturn, the author W. G. Sebald describes travelling by train from Norwich and crossing the line to walk to Somerleyton Hall.

Services
 the typical Monday-Saturday off-peak service at Somerleyton is as follows:

References

External links 

Railway stations in Suffolk
DfT Category F2 stations
Former Great Eastern Railway stations
Greater Anglia franchise railway stations
Railway stations in Great Britain opened in 1847
Waveney District